Oroxylum indicum is a species of flowering plant belonging to the monotypic genus Oroxylum and the family Bignoniaceae, and is commonly called Indian trumpet tree, oroxylum, Indian trumpet flower, broken bones, Indian caper, scythe tree or tree of Damocles. Various segments of the tree are used in traditional medicine, where it is known as Shyonaka or Sona Patha.

Description
The large leaf stalks wither and fall off the tree and collect near the base of the trunk, appearing to look like a pile of broken limb bones.

The tree is a night-bloomer and flowers are adapted to natural pollination by bats. The long fruits curve downward and resemble the wings of a large bird or dangling sickles or swords in the night, giving the name "tree of Damocles". The seeds are round with papery wings.

Distribution
Oroxylum indicum is native to the Indian subcontinent, the Himalayan foothills with a part extending to Bhutan and southern China, Indochina and the Malesia regions. In Vietnam, the tree is called núc nác (sometimes sò đo), and specimens can be found in Cat Tien National Park.

It is visible in the forest biome of Manas National Park in Assam, India. It is found, raised and planted in large number in the forest areas of the Banswara district in the state of Rajasthan in India. It is reported in the list of rare, endangered and threatened plants of Kerala (South India). It is also found in Sri Lanka.

Ecology
Oroxylum indicum lives in relationship with the actinomycete Pseudonocardia oroxyli present in the soil surrounding the roots. Septobasidium bogoriense is a fungal species responsible for velvet blight in O. indicum.

Phytochemistry
Various segments of O. indicum, including leaves, root bark, heartwood, and seeds, contain diverse phytochemicals, such as prunetin, sitosterol, oroxindin, oroxylin-A, biochanin-A, ellagic acid, tetuin, anthraquinone, and emodin. Several of the compounds are under preliminary research to identify their potential biological properties.

Uses
The tree is often grown as an ornamental plant for its strange appearance. Materials used include the wood, tannins and dyestuffs.

In marriage rituals 
The plant is used by the Kirat, Sunuwar, Rai, Limbu, Yakha, Tamang in Nepal, the Thai in Thailand and the Lao in Laos.

In the Himalayas, people hang sculptures or garlands made from O. indicum (Skr. shyonaka) seeds from the roof of their homes in belief they provide protection.

As food

It is a plant with edible leaves, flower buds, pods and stems. 
The large young pods, known as Lin mai or Lin fa in Loei, are eaten especially in Thailand and Laos. They are first grilled over charcoal fire and then the inner tender seeds are usually scraped and eaten along with lap. Known as karongkandai among the Bodos of north east India, its flowers and fruit are eaten as a bitter side dish with rice. It is often prepared with fermented or dried fish and believed by them to have medicinal uses. The pods also eaten by Chakma people in Chittagong hill tracts of Bangladesh and India. Its called "Hona Gulo 𑄦𑄧𑄚 𑄉𑄪𑄣𑄮" in Chakma language.

The plant is an important food item among the Karen people, who also appreciate it for its medicinal value. The flower buds are boiled and pickled. The young pods are cut open raw and the tender seeds inside, having the color and texture of lettuce leaves, are used in various local dishes.

In traditional medicines
Oroxylum indicum seeds are used in traditional Indian Ayurvedic and Chinese medicines. Root bark is one of the ingredients thought to be useful in compound formulations in Ayurveda and other folk remedies.

In art
Kelantanese and Javanese peoples forge a type of keris in the shape of the plant's seed pod called the keris buah beko.

Gallery

See also
List of Thai ingredients

References

Bignoniaceae
Plants used in Ayurveda
Plants used in traditional Chinese medicine
Decorative fruits and seeds
Flora of tropical Asia
Plants described in 1753
Taxa named by Carl Linnaeus
Lamiales of Asia